Cool Struttin is an album by jazz pianist Sonny Clark that was released by Blue Note Records in August 1958. Described as an "enduring hard-bop classic" by The New York Times, the album features alto saxophonist Jackie McLean, trumpeter Art Farmer and two members of the Miles Davis Quintet, drummer Philly Joe Jones and bassist Paul Chambers. According to The Stereo Times, the album enjoys "a nearly cult status among hardcore jazz followers", a reputation AllMusic asserts it deserves "for its soul appeal alone".

Originally released on LP in 1958 by Blue Note, the album has been re-released on CD many times, also featuring two bonus tracks. In 1991, Blue Note released a Christmas themed CD called Yule Struttin with a cover derived from the sleeve design for this album.

Track listing 
Except where otherwise noted, tracks composed by Sonny Clark.

 "Cool Struttin'" – 9:23
 "Blue Minor" – 10:19
 "Sippin' at Bells" (Miles Davis) – 8:18
 "Deep Night" (Charles Henderson, Rudy Vallée) – 9:34

Bonus tracks on CD reissue:
 "Royal Flush" – 9:00
 "Lover" (Lorenz Hart, Richard Rodgers) – 7:01

Personnel
 Sonny Clark – piano
 Jackie McLean – alto saxophone
 Art Farmer – trumpet
 Paul Chambers – bass
 Philly Joe Jones – drums

Production
 Alfred Lion – producer
 Rudy Van Gelder – engineer
 Michael Cuscuna – reissue producer, liner notes

Album cover 
The album cover, designed by Reid Miles, features an original photograph by Francis Wolff of Alfred Lion's wife, Ruth.

References 

1958 albums
Sonny Clark albums
Albums produced by Alfred Lion
Blue Note Records albums
Albums produced by Michael Cuscuna
Albums recorded at Van Gelder Studio
Hard bop albums